Xian Henghan (September 30, 1911 – November 19, 1991) was a People's Liberation Army lieutenant general and People's Republic of China politician. He was ethnically a member of the Zhuang people and born in Tianyang County, Guangxi. He participated in the Baise Uprising of November 1929 and later joined the Chinese Workers' and Peasants' Red Army. He was Communist Party of China Committee Secretary and Governor of Gansu. He died in Lanzhou.

1911 births
1991 deaths
Zhuang people
Chinese Communist Party politicians from Guangxi
People's Republic of China politicians from Guangxi
People's Liberation Army generals from Guangxi
Governors of Gansu
Political office-holders in Gansu